Kirkwood is a surname of Scottish origin which means "the wood near the church." Notable people with the surname include:

Antoinette Kirkwood (born 1930), English musician and composer
Archy Kirkwood, Baron Kirkwood of Kirkhope (born 1946), British politician
Billy Kirkwood (born 1958), Scottish football athlete and coach
Bob Kirkwood (born 1939), United States businessman in California 
Bryan Kirkwood (producer) (born 1976), Scottish-born British television producer
Carly Flynn (fl. 1990s-present), New Zealand journalist, born Carly Kirkwood
Carol Kirkwood (fl. 1980s-present), Scottish BBC TV presenter
Craig Kirkwood (born 1974), United States lawyer
Cris Kirkwood (born 1960), United States musician
Curt Kirkwood (born 1957), United States musician
Dan Kirkwood (1900-1977), Scottish athlete in football
Daniel Kirkwood (1814-1895), United States astronomer
Daniel Kirkwood (footballer born 1867), Scottish athlete in football
David Kirkwood (1872-1955), British politician
Davie Kirkwood (born 1967), Scottish athlete in football
Don Kirkwood (born 1949), United States athlete in baseball
Euan Kirkwood (born 1934), Scottish cricketer
Fred Kirkwood (1890-1956), Australian athlete in football
Harry Kirkwood (fl. 1930s-1960s), British naval captain
Henry Kirkwood (1886–1954), English cricketer and British Army officer
James Kirkwood (disambiguation), any of several men with the name
Jimmy Kirkwood (born 1962), Irish field hockey player and cricketer
Joe Kirkwood, Jr. (born 1920), Australian-born United States golfer and film actor
Joe Kirkwood, Sr. (1897-1970), Australian golfer and actor
John A. Kirkwood (1851-1930), United States military hero 
John Gamble Kirkwood (1907-1959), United States chemist and physicist
Julieta Kirkwood (1936–1985), Chilean sociologist, political scientist, professor, and activist
Keith Kirkwood (born 1993), American football player
Ken Kirkwood (born 1969), Canadian bioethicist 
Lucy Kirkwood (born 1984), British playwright
Mary Kirkwood (1904–1995), American artist
Pat Kirkwood (racing driver) (1927-2001), United States NASCAR participant
Patricia Kirkwood (1921-2007), British stage actress
Robert C. Kirkwood (1909-1964), United States politician in California
Sam Kirkwood (1910-1980), Irish athlete in football 
Samuel J. Kirkwood (1813-1894), United States politician
Thomas William Kirkwood (1884-?), Scottish athlete in polo 
Thomas Kirkwood (born 1951), South Africa-born English biologist
Te Rongo Kirkwood (fl. 2000s-present), New Zealand glass sculptor

See also 

 Wood (surname)

References

Surnames of Scottish origin